Baldwin of Avesnes (September 1219 in Oizy – 10 April 1295 in Avesnes) was a son of Bouchard IV of Avesnes and his wife, Margaret II of Flanders.  His parents' marriage was later declared illegal, because his father had already received minor orders.  Baldwin was later declared legitimate by the pope, at the instigation of King Louis IX of France.  In 1246, Baldwin received Beaumont as an apanage.

He fought his whole life, together with his brother John I, against his half-brothers from his mother's second marriage with William II of Dampierre.  He was said to be responsible for the accident that killed his half-brother William III of Dampierre during a tournament in Trazegnies.  After the Edict of Péronne and the death of his brother John, he reconciled with his mother, who sent him to Namur on a revenge expedition.

In 1287, Baldwin sold Dunkirk and Warneton to Guy, Count of Flanders.  He is also known as a chronicler; he wrote the Chronique Universelle.

Charles Verlinden identifies the diplomat Baldwin of Hainaut as Baldwin of Avesnes.

Marriage and issue 
In 1243, Baldwin married Felicitas (1220-1307), the daughter of Thomas II of Coucy, Lord of Vervins.  Baldwin was the father of:

 John (d. 1283), married Agnes of Valence, the daughter of William de Valence, 1st Earl of Pembroke.  She was the widow of Hugh de Balliol, the son of John de Balliol
 Beatrice (d. 1321), married in 1281 Henry (d. 1288), the son of Henry V, Count of Luxembourg.

References

Sources

Avesnes family
1219 births
1295 deaths
13th-century people of the Holy Roman Empire